Tylopsis lilifolia, the lily bush-cricket, is a species of Orthopterans in the subfamily Phaneropterinae. It is found in Europe and Asia.

Distribution and habitat
This species is present especially in southern Europe (not the British Isles or Scandinavia) and it is widespread in the Mediterranean region. It can also be found in North Africa and in the Near East, in Iran and in the Caucasus. It mainly inhabits sunny meadows, shrubs and forest clearings.

Description

This species has two different forms of color. The basic coloration of the body varies from olive green or pale green to light brown with a brown-yellowish longitudinal band on the back. Head, legs and wings are green. The legs are long and thin, with small spines. The antennae are very long, they reach up to five times the body length. In the dry grasslands it is common a brown form of the body.

Biology
Adults can be encountered from August through October.

References

Ragge (1964) A revision of the genus Tylopsis Fieber (Orthoptera: Tettigoniidae), Bulletin of the British Museum (Natural History) Entomology (Bull. Br. Mus. (Nat. Hist.) Ent.) 15:297-322
Heiko Bellmann: Der Kosmos Heuschreckenführer. Die Arten Mitteleuropas sicher bestimmen. Franckh-Kosmos Verlags GmbH & Co. KG, Stuttgart 2006, 
Mace, E. 2011. Présence de Tylopsis lilifolia (Fabricius, 1793) en Haute-Normandie (Ensifera, Tettigoniidae). L’Entomologiste Haut-Normand 1: 27-28.

External links
 Sound recordings of Tylopsis lilifolia on BioAcoustica

Tettigoniidae
Insects described in 1793
Orthoptera of Europe